Mika "Hirvi" Kottila (born 22 September 1974) is a Finnish former professional footballer. He played as a forward and spent the vast majority of his career playing in Nordic countries.

Club career
Kottila was born in Vantaa, Finland. He joined RoPS in 1992. He had a spell on loan at Hereford United during the 1996–97 season. He made 13 league appearances, scoring 1 goal.

He then joined HJK Helsinki for the second of three spells, having previously played for the club during the 1994 season. He made 157 appearances and scored 56 goals for the club during his three spells.
The top moment of his career came when he scored two goals in UEFA Champions League 1998.

He moved to Norway to play for SK Brann where he was in the 1999 season, and then Sweden to play for Trelleborgs FF. A third spell at HJK followed between 2002 and 2004. He also featured in the 2004 UEFA Champions League playing against the likes of Linfield and Maccabi Tel Aviv F.C. in the qualifying rounds.

Between 2005 and 2006 he played for FC Lahti in the Finnish Premier Division.

International career
He was capped 31 times for Finland, scoring 6 goals between 1998 and 2004.

References

1974 births
Living people
Association football forwards
Finnish footballers
Finland international footballers
Veikkausliiga players
FinnPa players
Helsingin Jalkapalloklubi players
Rovaniemen Palloseura players
Hereford United F.C. players
SK Brann players
FC Lahti players
Allsvenskan players
Eliteserien players
Finnish expatriate footballers
Expatriate footballers in Norway
Finnish expatriate sportspeople in Norway
Expatriate footballers in England
Trelleborgs FF players
Finnish expatriate sportspeople in England
Expatriate footballers in Sweden
Finnish expatriate sportspeople in Sweden
Sportspeople from Vantaa